Spasenija Cana Babović was a Yugoslav politician. 

She was appointed Minister of Labour 1946–1948, Minister of Health 1948–1953, and Deputy Prime Minister 1953–1963.

References

Yugoslav women in politics
Government ministers of Yugoslavia